Acropora lokani is a species of acroporid coral that was first described by C. C. Wallace in 1994. It is listed as vulnerable on the IUCN Red List, and is believed to have a decreasing population. It is not common but found over a large area, including in three regions of Indonedia, and is listed under CITES Appendix II.

Description
The branches divide into branchlets, which contain axial, incipient axial, and radial corallites. The radial corallites are small and are both surrounded by and contain elaborate spinules. The species looks similar to Acropora caroliniana and Acropora granulosa. It is found in sheltered lagoons, flats of shallow reefs, patch reefs, and in other shallow marine environments. It is composed of aragonite (calcium carbonate).

Distribution
Acropora lokani is not common but found over a large area; the Indo-Pacific, Fiji, Southeast Asia, American Samoa, Raja Ampat, the Solomon Islands, Pohnpei, and also the Great Barrier Reef. It is native to American Samoa, Australia, three regions of Indonesia, Fiji, Micronesia, Malaysia, New Caledonia, Papua New Guine, Samoa, Singapore, Thailand, the Philippines, and the Solomon Islands. There is a lack of population data for the coral, but numbers are believed to be declining. It is threatened by climate change, rising sea temperatures causing bleaching, reef destruction, coral disease, being prey to starfish Acanthaster planci, and human activity. It is listed as a vulnerable species on the IUCN Red List, is listed under CITES Appendix II, and may occur within Marine Protected Areas.

Taxonomy
It was first described by C. C. Wallace in 1994 in the Indo-Pacific Ocean as Acropora lokani.

References

Acropora
Cnidarians of the Pacific Ocean
Fauna of the Indian Ocean
Marine fauna of Asia
Marine fauna of Oceania
Fauna of Southeast Asia
Vulnerable fauna of Asia
Vulnerable fauna of Oceania
Animals described in 1994